Minillas may refer to the following places:

 Minillas, Bayamón, Puerto Rico, a barrio
 Minillas, San Germán, Puerto Rico, a barrio
 Minillas (Santurce), a subbarrio of Santurce barrio in San Juan municipality in Puerto Rico
 Minillas Tunnel in Puerto Rico
 Minillas River in Puerto Rico